Tenth is the tenth album (ninth studio album) by The Marshall Tucker Band. It was recorded in 1980 in Coconut Grove, Florida, at Bayshore Recording Studios, and was the final studio album with Tommy Caldwell who died from injuries sustained in a car crash later the same year.

Artistry
The album features a southern rock sound.

Track listing
All songs written by Toy Caldwell, except where noted.

"It Takes Time" - 3:34
"Without You" (Tommy Caldwell) - 3:36
"See You One More Time" - 3:51
"Disillusion" (Jerry Eubanks/George McCorkle) - 3:57
"Cattle Drive" (Toy Caldwell/Tommy Caldwell) - 6:19
"Gospel Singin' Man" (McCorkle) - 3:26
"Save My Soul" - 4:36
"Sing My Blues" - 3:27
"Jimi" (instrumental) (Toy Caldwell/McCorkle) - 2:14
"Foolish Dreaming" (Doug Gray/McCorkle) - 4:52

References

1980 albums
Marshall Tucker Band albums
Albums produced by Stewart Levine